Estadio Camping Resort was a football field in Chilibre, Panamá Province, for several seasons hosted Alianza F.C. home matches. The field was converted on a huge parking lot operated a by a private customs bond company.

Football venues in Panama
Buildings and structures in Panamá Province

pl:Estadio Municipal de Balboa